Bucculatrix flourensiae is a species of moth in the family Bucculatricidae. It is found in North America, where it has been recorded from Arizona. It was described by Annette Frances Braun in 1963.

The wingspan is 6.5–7 mm. The forewings are greyish white, with a faint ocherous tinge. Most of the scales shade through ocherous to blackish brown at the tips. The hindwings are pale fuscous.

The larvae feed on Flourensia cernua. The entire leaf, except the upper epidermis and the network of veins, is consumed. Pupation takes place in a pale green cocoon, which is spun on the underside of the leaf.

References

Natural History Museum Lepidoptera generic names catalog

Bucculatricidae
Moths described in 1963
Moths of North America
Taxa named by Annette Frances Braun